is a Japanese costume designer. She won the 2008 Genie Award for Best Achievement in Costume Design. She is the daughter of famous filmmaker Akira Kurosawa and actress Yōko Yaguchi, her son is actor Takayuki Kato. She is married to the son of actor Daisuke Katō. She provided the costumes for Zatōichi.

Recognition 
 2008 Genie Award for Best Achievement in Costume Design - Silk - Won (with Carlo Poggioli)

References

External links 
 

Akira Kurosawa
Japanese costume designers
Best Costume Design Genie and Canadian Screen Award winners
1954 births
Place of birth missing (living people)
Living people